Shakial Taylor (born December 27, 1996) is an American football cornerback who is a free agent. He played college football at the University of Kansas.

College career
Taylor began his collegiate career at South Dakota State, playing for one year before transferring to Mesa Community College. In his only year at Mesa, Taylor broke up 18 passes with an interception and 42 total tackles. He transferred to the University of Kansas for his final two seasons of eligibility over offers from Arizona State, Memphis, UNLV, New Mexico, and Middle Tennessee State. In his first season with the Jayhawks, Taylor started the first nine games of the season before suffering season-ending injury and made 22 tackles with six pass-breakups. As a senior, Taylor recorded 47 tackles, three interceptions (one returned for a touchdown), seven passes defensed and two forced fumbles.

Professional career

Indianapolis Colts
Taylor signed with the Indianapolis Colts as an undrafted free agent on May 7, 2019. Despite having a great preseason & training camp, he was waived due to a concussion injury at the final cuts of training camp. Taylor took an injury settlement and couldn't sign back with the Colts until week 5. He was re-signed in week 5 to the team's practice squad. 
He was promoted to the active roster on October 5, 2019. Taylor made his NFL debut on October 6, 2019 against the Kansas City Chiefs, making one tackle and breaking up a pass. He was waived on November 25, 2019.

Denver Broncos
On November 26, 2019, Taylor was claimed off waivers by the Denver Broncos.

Taylor signed a one-year exclusive-rights free agent tender with the Broncos on April 18, 2020. He was waived on July 27, 2020.

New York Giants
On July 28, 2020, Taylor was claimed off waivers by the New York Giants and the team waived him five days later. He chose to opt-out of the 2020 NFL season due to the COVID-19 pandemic, and was reinstated to the Giants' roster on their opt-out reserve list on August 25, 2020. He was waived after the season on February 12, 2021.

Philadelphia Eagles
On February 16, 2021, Taylor was claimed off waivers by the Philadelphia Eagles. He was waived on August 5, 2021.

Personal life
Taylor is the nephew of NFL cornerback Robert Nelson.

References

External links
Kansas Jayhawks bio
Indianapolis Colts bio

Living people
1996 births
African-American players of American football
Players of American football from Florida
Sportspeople from Lakeland, Florida
Mesa Thunderbirds football players
South Dakota State Jackrabbits football players
Kansas Jayhawks football players
American football cornerbacks
Indianapolis Colts players
Denver Broncos players
New York Giants players
Philadelphia Eagles players
21st-century African-American sportspeople